The Falkirk Braes is a geographical and sociopolitical entity within the Falkirk local authority area in Scotland. The population (both suburban and rural) is approximately 32,000 (2018), about 20% of the total for Falkirk council area.

Description

 

Covering an area of high ground within  to the south and east of the county town Falkirk and south of Grangemouth, its core comprises a number of small villages including mining and quarrying communities, which have each expanded to form a near-contiguous acentric suburban environment. Historically within Stirlingshire, most of the Braes villages fell under Grangemouth parish, while Laurieston was part of Falkirk parish and the south-east including Maddiston was in Muiravonside parish. The largest village, with the majority of amenities such as health centre and library, is Polmont, but this is not at the geographical centre of the agglomeration and is itself spread over a wide territory, having grown in several places in different eras. The centre could be argued to be west of Polmont at the site of the Meadowbank Colliery and Brickworks, nominally in Redding; due to its industrial history, it is one of the undeveloped parcels of land in the area.

 
The area returns six representatives to Falkirk Council, three each representing the Lower Braes and Upper Braes wards, divided by the Union Canal which runs east-west through the territory; both wards (particularly Upper Braes) also include outlying rural villages such as Shieldhill, Slamannan and Whitecross in addition to the cluster of villages closer to Falkirk. In wider political contexts, as of 2019 the Braes falls wholly within the Falkirk East constituency at Holyrood, but at Westminster is divided between Linlithgow and East Falkirk and Falkirk.

 
The local secondary school, with approximately 1,000 pupils and six feeder primaries across the Upper Braes, is Braes High School, located in Reddingmuirhead (adjacent to HMYOI Polmont). However, in the Lower Braes the eponymous primary schools in Laurieston, Westquarter and Whitecross, plus St Margaret's Primary in Polmont, are affiliated to Graeme High School in east Falkirk.

Muiravonside Country Park between Maddiston and Whitecross (featuring the Avon Aqueduct) is also within the area. The River Avon flows through the park - it denotes the eastern and southern boundaries of the Braes territory.

List of localities
Displaying 2011 census figures.

Villages in conurbation

 Total 22,197
 Brightons 4,461
 Laurieston 2,633
 Maddiston 3,099
 Polmont 5,322
 Redding 2,276
 Reddingmuirhead 1,556
 Rumford 884
 Wallacestone 693
 Westquarter 1,193

Isolated villages on periphery
 Avonbridge 652
 Binniehill 
 California 810
 Limerigg 219
 Shieldhill 2,523
 Slamannan 1,382
 Standburn 151
 Whitecross 776

See also
List of places in Falkirk council area

References

External links
Braes local news at Falkirk Herald
Falkirk Local History Society 
Dave Leask's Maddiston Pages (local history)

Populated places in Falkirk (council area)